The 2008–09 Luxembourg Cup is the eighty-fourth season of Luxembourg's annual cup competition. It began on 3 September 2008 with Round 1 and ended on 30 May 2009 with the Final held at a neutral venue. The winners of the competition will qualify for the second qualifying round of the 2009–10 UEFA Europa League. CS Grevenmacher are the defending champions.

Round 1
Fifty-two teams from Division 2 (IV) and Division 3 (V) entered in this round. Forty of them competed in matches, with the other twelve teams were awarded a bye. The games were played on September 3, 2008.

Bye: US Boevange, CS Bourscheid, FC Brouch, Vinesca Ehnen, Excelsior Grevels, FC Kopstal, AS Luxembourg-Porto, Marisca Mersch, US Moutfort, US Reisdorf, Résidence Walferdange, Yellow Boys Weiler

Round 2
The winners of Round 1 competed in this round. The games were played on September 28, 2008.

Round 3
The winners of Round 2 competed in this round, as well as twenty-eight teams from Division 1 (III), which entered the competition in this round. The games were played on November 2, 2008.

Round 4
Twenty-two winners of Round 3 competed in this round, as well as fourteen teams from the Division of Honour (II), which entered the competition in this round. The games were played on December 7, 2008.

Round 5
Eighteen winners of Round 4 competed in this round, as well as fourteen teams from the National Division, which entered the competition in this round. The games were played on February 21, 2009.

Round 6
The winners of Round 5 competed in this round. The games were played on April 10 and 11, 2009.

Quarterfinals

Semifinals

Final

External links
 Official page 
 Private homepage about everything regarding Luxembourg soccer 

Luxembourg Cup seasons
Luxembourg Cup, 2008-09
Luxembourg Cup, 2008-09